The 2020–21 season is Lee Man's 4th consecutive season in Hong Kong Premier League, the top-tier division in Hong Kong football. The club selects Tseung Kwan O Sports Ground as their home stadium.

Squad

Current squad 
As of 8 November 2020

 FP

 FP

 FP
 LP

Players' positions as per club's announcement. 
Remarks:
LP These players are considered as local players in Hong Kong domestic football competitions.
FP These players are registered as foreign players.

Transfers

Transfers in

Transfers out

Club officials

 Chairperson: Norman Lee
 Vice Chairperson: Kwok Ching Yee
 Director: Lam Chak Yu
 Head coach:  Chan Hiu Ming
 Assistant coach:  Tsang Chiu Tat
 Assistant coach:  Jordi Tarrés
 Technical director:  Chan Hung Ping
 Academy director:  Matthew Mark Holland
 First-team goalkeeping coach: Cheng Ho Man
 Fitness coach: Choi Chan In
 Performance analysts: Kwok Chun Lam, Yeung Lok Man

Matches

Table

Hong Kong Premier League

On 5 November 2020, the fixtures for the forthcoming season were announced.

Results by round

Hong Kong Sapling Cup

Group stage

Statistics

Appearances
Players with no appearances not included in the list.

Goalscorers
Includes all competitive matches.

Clean sheets

Disciplinary record

References

Lee Man FC seasons
Hong Kong football clubs 2020–21 season